Antonio Dominguez Alvarez is a Panamanian businessman and former member of the board of directors of the Panama Canal. He is now the Inspector General of the Panama Canal.

Business 
Dominguez Alvarez worked at various private sector companies for 30 years before becoming the Inspector General of the Panama Canal. This included a role as director of Frito-Lay for Central America.

Panama Canal 
In 2001, Mireya Moscoso assigned him to the role as one of the members of the board of directors of the Panama Canal so he could focus in the areas of finances and accounting. He served in this post until 2010. In 2012, he was appointed as the Inspector General of the Panama Canal. He is currently serving in this job post.

References 

1957 births
Living people
Panamanian businesspeople